Kicin  is a village in the administrative district of Gmina Ojrzeń, within Ciechanów County, Masovian Voivodeship, in east-central Poland. It was established by German Mennonite and Lutheran settlers on the estate of Count Kicinski around 1842.

References

Kicin